Sphinx leucophaeata is a moth of the  family Sphingidae.

Distribution 
It is known from north-western Mexico with an occasional stray into Texas.

Description 
The length of the forewings is 62–75 mm.

Biology 
There is probably one generation per year with adults on wing from late June to early August.

References

Sphinx (genus)
Moths described in 1859